Béla Dinesz (12 October 1930 – August 1994) was a Hungarian racewalker. He competed in the men's 50 kilometres walk at the 1960 Summer Olympics.

References

1930 births
1994 deaths
Athletes (track and field) at the 1960 Summer Olympics
Hungarian male racewalkers
Olympic athletes of Hungary
Place of birth missing
20th-century Hungarian people